Abolhassan Ilchi-Kabir (born 1938) was an Iranian deaf Wrestler and Deaflympics Gold-Medalist. Iran Wrestling Federation has named Iranian deaf Wrestlers championship "Haj-Ali Eftekhar & Abolhassan Ilchi Kabir Cup" to honor him.

References 

1938 births
Deaf martial artists
Living people
Iranian male sport wrestlers
Iranian deaf people
20th-century Iranian people